Jelski's chat-tyrant (Silvicultrix jelskii) is a species of passerine bird in the family Tyrannidae. It is found Peru and southern Ecuador. Its natural habitat is subtropical or tropical moist montane forests.

References

Jelski's chat-tyrant
Birds of the Ecuadorian Andes
Birds of the Peruvian Andes
Jelski's chat-tyrant
Jelski's chat-tyrant
Taxonomy articles created by Polbot